The Army Group Rupprecht of Bavaria or Army Group A was an Army Group of the German Army, which operated on the Western Front under command of Rupprecht, Crown Prince of Bavaria , between 28 August 1916 and 11 November 1918 during World War I. It was formed from the short-lived Army Group Gallwitz under Max von Gallwitz (19 July - 28 August 1916).

History 
At the start of the Battle of the Somme (July 1916), the German 2nd Army had grown to such an extent, that a decision was made to split it into two armies.  The 1st Army was recreated on 19 July 1916 from the right (northern) wing of the 2nd Army.  The new commander of the reduced 2nd Army, Max von Gallwitz, was also installed as commander of Army Group Gallwitz (Heeresgruppe Gallwitz) to co-ordinate the actions of both armies on the Somme.

On 28 August 1916, two extra armies (6th and 7th) were added to the Army Group, which was renamed Army Group Rupprecht of Bavaria, after its new commander Rupprecht, Crown Prince of Bavaria. The Army Group remained in place until the end of the war.

Composition 
 German 1st Army (Fritz von Below) : Jul 1916 – Apr 1917
 German 2nd Army (Max von Gallwitz then Georg von der Marwitz then Adolph von Carlowitz) : Jul 1916 – Nov 1918 
 German 6th Army (Ludwig von Falkenhausen then Otto von Below then Ferdinand von Quast) : Aug 1916 – Nov 1918
 German 7th Army (Richard von Schubert then Max von Boehn) : Aug 1916 – Apr 1917   
 German 4th Army (Friedrich Sixt von Armin) : Mar 1917 – Nov 1918
 German 17th Army (Otto von Below then Bruno von Mudra) : Feb–Nov 1918

Sources
The Soldier's Burden
Die Deutschen Heeresgruppen im Ersten Weltkrieg
Die deutschen Heeresgruppen Teil 1, Erster Weltkrieg

References

Bibliography 
 

Rupprecht
Military units and formations of Germany in World War I
Military units and formations established in 1916
Military units and formations disestablished in 1918